The 42nd edition of the annual Clásico RCN was held from August 11 to August 18, 2002 in Colombia. The stage race with an UCI rate of 2.3 started in Cali and finished in Sopó. RCN stands for "Radio Cadena Nacional" – one of the oldest and largest radio networks in the nation.

Stages

2002-08-11: Cali — Armenia (190 km)

2002-08-12: Armenia — Manizales (153.8 km)

2002-08-13: Manizales — Sabaneta (190.6 km)

2002-08-14: Medellín — Puerto Berrio (175 km)

2002-08-15: La Dorada — Ibagué (168 km)

2002-08-16: Ibagué — Mosquera (191.8 km)

2002-08-17: Circuito Parque Simón Bolívar, Bogotá (100 km)

2002-08-18: Sopo — Alto de Patios (33.8 km)

Final classification

See also 
 2002 Vuelta a Colombia

References 
 cyclingnews

Clásico RCN
Clasico RCN
Clasico RCN